Greyshirt or Grayshirt may refer to:

Greyshirt, a comic book character. 
Greyshirts, a former South African political movement
Grayshirt (college sports), a college athlete who delays enrollment for a portion of an academic year
Grey Shirts, a fascist group in 1934 American novel The President Vanishes and film